Håkon Røsten (born 21 February 2005) is a Norwegian footballer who plays for Norwegian club Rosenborg.

Club career

Håkon signed for Rosenborg from Oppdal in 2022. At the end of the year he signed a new contract and became a part of the first team squad.

He made his debut 19 May 2022 against Verdal in the Norwegian Cup.

On 4 September 2022, Håkon made his league debut in a 4-1 win over Viking coming on as a substitute.

Career statistics

Club

References

External links
 

2005 births
People from Oppdal
Living people
Norwegian footballers
Association football forwards
Rosenborg BK players
Eliteserien players